Harald Arnljot Øye (born 1 February 1935) is a Norwegian chemist.

He took the  degree in 1963. He was a professor of inorganic chemistry at the Norwegian Institute of Technology from 1973 to his retirement. He has also led the International Course on Process Metallurgy of Aluminium since 1981. He is a fellow of the Norwegian Academy of Science and Letters and the Norwegian Academy of Technological Sciences. In November 2016, FLOGEN Star Outreach awarded him with the Fray International Sustainability Award at SIPS 2016 (Sustainable Industrial Processing Summit), in Hainan Island, China.

References

1935 births
Living people
Norwegian chemists
Norwegian Institute of Technology alumni
Academic staff of the Norwegian Institute of Technology
Academic staff of the Norwegian University of Science and Technology
Members of the Norwegian Academy of Science and Letters
Members of the Norwegian Academy of Technological Sciences